Blood & Belief is the third studio album by English heavy metal band Blaze Bayley, then known as Blaze, released in 2004. It is the first album that did not have the complete original line-up, as Jeff Singer and Rob Naylor left just after the recording of the band's first live album, As Live as It Gets.

The album contains more emotional themes than the previous two Blaze albums, which dealt more with science fiction themes. A promotional video of the track "Hollow Head" was made, but no singles were released from the album. After touring for the album, the entire band left except for Bayley, leaving him to start from scratch.

Track listing

Personnel 
Blaze Bayley – vocals
Steve Wray – guitar
John Slater – guitar
Wayne Banks – bass
Jason Bowld – drums

References 

Blaze Bayley albums
2004 albums
SPV/Steamhammer albums
Albums produced by Andy Sneap